Cartesian means of or relating to the French philosopher René Descartes—from his Latinized name Cartesius. It may refer to:

Mathematics
Cartesian closed category, a closed category in category theory
Cartesian coordinate system, modern rectangular coordinate system
Cartesian diagram, a construction in category theory
Cartesian geometry, now more commonly called analytic geometry
Cartesian morphism, formalisation of pull-back operation in category theory
Cartesian oval, a curve
Cartesian product, a direct product of two sets
Cartesian product of graphs, a binary operation on graphs
Cartesian tree, a binary tree in computer science

Philosophy
Cartesian anxiety, a hope that studying the world will give us unchangeable knowledge of ourselves and the world
Cartesian circle, a potential mistake in reasoning
Cartesian doubt, a form of methodical skepticism as a basis for philosophical rigor
Cartesian dualism, the philosophy of the distinction between mind and body
Cartesianism, the philosophy of René Descartes
Cartesianists, followers of Cartesianism
Cartesian Meditations, a work by Edmund Husserl
Cartesian linguistics, a work by Noam Chomsky
Cartesian theatre, a derisive view of Cartesian dualism coined by Daniel Dennett

Science
Cartesian diver, a science experiment demonstrating buoyancy and the ideal gas law
Cartesian physics, attempts to explain gravity without a need for action at distance

See also

 
 Cart (disambiguation)
 Carte (disambiguation)
 Cartes (disambiguation)
 Descartes (disambiguation)